The Super A'can is a home video game console released exclusively in Taiwan in 1995 by Funtech/Dunhuang Technology. It is based around the Motorola 68000 microchip, which is also used in the Sega Genesis and Neo Geo. Twelve games have been confirmed to exist for the system.

Commercial performance
The Super A'Can failed because its initial costs were too high for customers. It had no chance to compete with fifth generation video game consoles, such as the PlayStation, the Nintendo 64 and the Sega Saturn, all of which were more powerful and offered 3D graphics. The Super A'Can performed so poorly that it lost its company, Funtech, over USD $6 million. In the end, Funtech destroyed all equipment from  production and development of the system, and sold off all remaining systems to the United States as scrap parts.

Technical specifications

Peripherals
A CD-ROM attachment (similar to Sega's Mega CD add-on), and a CPU/Graphics upgrade (similar to Sega's 32X add-on) were planned but unreleased.

List of games

Released

Unreleased

References

 A'can: An ill-fated console from Taiwan (English subtitled). YouTube. October 25, 2017.
 PakuPakuStory Blog - Super A'can

External links
 Fan site (via archive.org)
 Video Game Console Library page
 Super A'Can games playable for free in the browser at the Internet Archive Console Living Room

Products introduced in 1995
Home video game consoles
Fourth-generation video game consoles
1990s toys
68k-based game consoles